Yoros may refer to:

 Yoros Castle, Turkey; a Byzantine castle at the mouth of the Bosphorus on the Black Sea
 Yoros, a fictional kingdom created by Clark Ashton Smith found in the fictional world of Zothique
 Yōrō Mountains, the Yōrōs, a mountain range between Mie and Gifu prefectures of Japan
 Montaña de Yoro National Park, Honduras

See also

 Yoro (disambiguation)